Beth Van Fleet (born June 27, 1977 in Tampa, Florida) is a female beach volleyball player from the United States who won the silver medal at the NORCECA Circuit 2009 at Guatemala playing with Saralyn Smith.

She also participated in the Association of Volleyball Professionals tournaments since 2003. There she ended up in the 9th position many times.

She played indoor volleyball in college with Georgia State where she received a marketing degree. With the Panthers she was two times "All Conference" Second Team and four times All Academic.

Van Fleet has served as the head coach for the Georgia State Panthers beach volleyball team since 2013.

Awards

College
 1998, 1999 "All Conference" Second Team
 1995–1999 All Conference "All Academic"

National Team
 NORCECA Beach Volleyball Circuit Guatemala 2009  Silver Medal
 NORCECA Beach Volleyball Circuit Manzanillo 2009  Bronze Medal

AVP
 2005 AVPNext National Championships  Gold Medal

References

External links
 
 Beth Van Fleet at the Association of Volleyball Professionals (archived)

1977 births
Living people
American women's beach volleyball players
Georgia State University alumni
Georgia State Panthers women's beach volleyball
21st-century American women